Abington is an area and electoral ward of Northampton, England. It is represented in Westminster by Michael Ellis, the MP for Northampton North, with the exception of a small minority of the electorate who live in and around Vernon Terrace and South Street, who are represented by Andrew Lewer, the MP for Northampton South. The population of the ward was 9,668 at the 2011 census.

Councillors 
Two councillors serve the ward.

Elections in 2010s

May 2015

May 2011

Elections in 2000s

May 2007

May 2003

Elections in 1990s

May 1999

References 

Northampton
Wards of Northamptonshire